Michel Goedert FRS, FMedSci is a Luxembourgish-British neuroscientist and former Head of Neurobiology, at the MRC Laboratory of Molecular Biology.

Goedert was born and raised in Luxembourg. After finishing his medical studies at the University of Basel in 1986, he started working at the Medical Research Council Laboratory of Molecular Biology affiliated with the University of Cambridge.

Goedert was awarded the Metlife Foundation Award for Medical Research in Alzheimer's Disease in 1996, the Potamkin Prize in 1998 and the European Grand Prix for Research by the Foundation for Research on Alzheimer's disease in 2014. In 2018 he was one of four recipients of the Grete Lundbeck European Brain Research Prize with the citation "For their groundbreaking research on the genetic and molecular basis of Alzheimer's disease, with far-reaching implications for the development of new therapeutic interventions as well as for the understanding of other neurodegenerative diseases of the brain". In 2019 he received the Royal Medal. and the Rainwater Charitable Foundation prize for outstanding innovation in neurodegenerative disorder research.

He is married to Maria Grazia Spillantini, a geneticist with whom he has one son, Thomas.

Research
Goedert's work combines biochemical, molecular biological and structural techniques to investigate common neurodegenerative diseases, including Alzheimer's and Parkinson's. His research focused on the abnormal filamentous inclusions that characterise Parkinson's and Alzheimer's, showing that the intracellular filaments of these diseases are made of either alpha-synuclein or tau protein. Goedert's team identified mutations in MAPT, the tau gene, that cause rare inherited forms of frontotemporal dementia with tau inclusions, establishing a central role for tau assembly in the disease.

Works

References

External links
Dr Michel Goedert

http://www.prion2014.org/images/bio_Goedert.pdf

20th-century births
Living people
British neuroscientists
University of Basel alumni
Academics of the University of Cambridge
Fellows of the Royal Society
Fellows of the Academy of Medical Sciences (United Kingdom)
Royal Medal winners
Alumni of the Athénée de Luxembourg
Year of birth missing (living people)
Place of birth missing (living people)